Flåmselvi or Moldåni is a  long river in Vestland county, Norway. The river is known as the Moldåni river in this area. It then flows through a series of lakes heading to the northwest where it crosses into Aurland Municipality. The Bergen Line follows the river to Myrdal. At Myrdal, the river goes over the Kjosfossen waterfall and it follows Flåmsdalen valley and heads to the north. When it reaches the village of Flåm, it empties into Aurlandsfjorden, a branch off the main Sognefjorden (Norway's longest fjord).

References

External links

Rivers of Vestland
Aurland
Ulvik
Rivers of Norway